Pražské schody 2010 represented sixteen years since Pražské schody (Prague Stairs) cycling race was first held in Pražský hrad, in the capital city of the Czech Republic. It took place on June 9, 2010.

Elite - Men

Elite - Women

See also
Pražské schody - main page

References
 - official results

2010
2010 in cyclo-cross